Latin Pop Albums is a record chart published in Billboard magazine that features Latin music sales information in regards to Latin pop music. The data is compiled by Nielsen SoundScan from a sample that includes music stores, music departments at electronics and department stores, Internet sales (both physical and digital) and verifiable sales from concert venues in the United States. Currently, Shakira holds the record of longest run topping the chart with her 2017 album El Dorado, 63 weeks in total so far (as of September 25, 2018).

Number-one albums
Key
 – Best-selling Latin pop album of the year

References
General

 For information about each week of this chart, follow this link; select a date to view the top albums for that particular week

Specific

Pop 2010s
United States Latin Pop Albums
2010s
2010s in Latin music